Arhopala zambra, the Zambra oakblue, is a species of butterfly belonging to the lycaenid family described by Charles Swinhoe in 1911. It is found in Southeast Asia (Myanmar, Thailand, Peninsular Malaya, Sumatra, Nia, Borneo, Bawean, Bangka, Java, the Philippines).

Subspecies
Arhopala zambra zambra (Burma, Thailand, Peninsular Malaysia, Sumatra, Nias, Borneo, Bawean, Bangka, Java)
Arhopala zambra plateni (Evans, 1957) (Philippines: Mindanao)
Arhopala zambra triviata Seki, 1994 (Philippines: Negros)
Arhopala zambra kitamurai Seki, 1994 (Philippines: Mindoro)

References

External links

Arhopala
Butterflies described in 1911
Taxa named by Charles Swinhoe
Butterflies of Asia